Best United Football Club is a Burmese football club, founded in 2013.

References

External links
 First Eleven Journal in Burmese
 Soccer Myanmar in Burmese
 Profile at Global Sports Archive

Association football clubs established in 2013
Myanmar National League clubs
2013 establishments in Myanmar
Football clubs in Myanmar